Guaranteed Irish is an American folk band from Pittsburgh, Pennsylvania, currently consisting of Bruce Foley, Patrick Folan and Jimmy Lamb. To date they have released three albums and are classified as an Irish folk band.

History
Bruce Foley met Patrick Folan in the late 1970s and the two played their first gig together. They played at a fundraiser for the local GAA. Jimmy Lamb joined the group in the late 1980s and the three have been together ever since.

Performances and Tours
The band mainly plays local performances in and around the Pittsburgh area but have also toured throughout the United States and Ireland. Annually since 2006 they have done a cruise with Isle Inn Tours called Ireland at Sea  and in January 2010 they joined fellow artists Seamus Kennedy, Fiona Molloy, Harry O'Donoghue on the cruise ship.

Notable Performances in the United States
The Pittsburgh Irish Festival (1991–present)
Riverstone Concert Series, Foxburg PA
Opened for The Irish Rovers at the A.J Palumbo Center
Monday Night Football at Heinz Field
The American Ireland Fund dinner Sponsored by the Pittsburgh Steelers(2003–present)
Opened for An Evening with Seamus Heaney (2004)
Several performances with Dave Hanner of Corbin/Hanner

Notable Performances in Ireland
 3 Tours of Ireland (1992–2008) playing in Belfast, Crossmaglen, Tuam, Clifden, Cleggan, Roundstone, County Galway, Bray
Featured in the Summerfest Festival, Roundstone, Co. Galway (2008)
The Clifden Arts Festival with John Sheehan of The Dubliners

Solo Performances
Bruce Foley played at Madison Square Gardens for Pete Seeger's 90th Birthday (May 3, 2009) and is a member of Tommy Sands (Irish folk singer) and his Irish Band  when he tours the United States.

Members

Current
Bruce Foley- vocals, Uilleann pipes, acoustic guitar, tin whistle, low whistle, bodhrán (1975–present)

Patrick Folan- vocals, button accordion, harmonica (1975–present)

Jimmy Lamb- vocals, bass guitar (1985–present)

Guest Members
Deke Kincaid  - Drum Kit, Djembe, and Percussion (1999–present)

Discography

Albums
Out in Front (1991)*CD Baby 

Live (1993) CD Baby

We Won't Come Home 'Til Morning (2008) CD Baby

All three albums were recorded with the record label, Killary Productions.

Contributions
It's All In the Song: A Tribute to Andy M. Stewart (2006)

References

External links
 guaranteedirish.net Official website

American folk musical groups
Irish-American culture in Pittsburgh
Musical groups from Pittsburgh